Tropinone is an alkaloid, famously synthesised in 1917 by Robert Robinson as a synthetic  precursor to atropine, a scarce commodity during World War I. Tropinone and the alkaloids cocaine and atropine all share the same tropane core structure. Its corresponding conjugate acid at pH 7.3 major species is known as tropiniumone.

Synthesis

The first synthesis of tropinone was by Richard Willstätter in 1901. It started from the seemingly related cycloheptanone, but required many steps to introduce the nitrogen bridge; the overall yield for the synthesis path is only 0.75%. Willstätter had previously synthesized cocaine from tropinone, in what was the first synthesis and elucidation of the structure of cocaine.

Robinson's "double Mannich" reaction

The 1917 synthesis by Robinson is considered a classic in total synthesis due to its simplicity and biomimetic approach. Tropinone is a bicyclic molecule, but the reactants used in its preparation are fairly simple: succinaldehyde, methylamine and acetonedicarboxylic acid (or even acetone). The synthesis is a good example of a biomimetic reaction or biogenetic-type synthesis because biosynthesis makes use of the same building blocks. It also demonstrates a tandem reaction in a one-pot synthesis. Furthermore, the yield of the synthesis was 17% and with subsequent improvements exceeded 90%.

This reaction is described as an intramolecular "double Mannich reaction" for obvious reasons. It is not unique in this regard, as others have also attempted it in piperidine synthesis.

In place of acetone, acetonedicarboxylic acid is known as the "synthetic equivalent" the 1,3-dicarboxylic acid groups are so-called "activating groups" to facilitate the ring forming reactions. The calcium salt is there as a "buffer" as it is claimed that higher yields are possible if the reaction is conducted at "physiological pH".

Reaction mechanism
The main features apparent from the reaction sequence below are:

Nucleophilic addition of methylamine to succinaldehyde, followed by loss of water to create an imine
Intramolecular addition of the imine to the second aldehyde unit and first ring closure 
Intermolecular Mannich reaction of the enolate of acetone dicarboxylate
New enolate formation and new imine formation with loss of water for
Second intramolecular Mannich reaction and second ring closure
Loss of 2 carboxylic groups to tropinone
 
 
 
Some authors have actually tried to retain one of the CO2H groups.

CO2R-tropinone has 4 stereoisomers, although the corresponding ecgonidine alkyl ester has only a pair of enantiomers.

From cycloheptanone
IBX dehydrogenation (oxidation) of cycloheptanone (suberone) to 2,6-cycloheptadienone [1192-93-4] followed by reaction with an amine is versatile a way of forming tropinones. The mechanism evoked is clearly delineated to be a double Michael reaction (i.e. conjugate addition).

Biochemistry method

Reduction of tropinone
The reduction of tropinone is mediated by NADPH-dependent reductase enzymes, which have been characterized in multiple plant species.  These plant species all contain two types of the reductase enzymes, tropinone reductase I and tropinone reductase II.  TRI produces tropine and TRII produces pseudotropine.  Due to differing kinetic and pH/activity characteristics of the enzymes and by the 25-fold higher activity of TRI over TRII, the majority of the tropinone reduction is from TRI to form tropine.

See also 
 Benztropine
 Daturaolone
 2-Carbomethoxytropinone (2-CMT) an intermediate in the creation of ecgonine cocaine analogues
Ecgonidine

References

External links 
 MSDS for tropinone

Tropane alkaloids
Ketones
Total synthesis